The Burnley Built-up area is an urban area or conurbation which extends from the town of Burnley to Padiham, Brierfield, Nelson, Barrowford and Colne in Lancashire, England. The area takes in parts of the boroughs of Burnley and Pendle, and also small parts of Hyndburn and Ribble Valley. It also includes a number of villages such as Blacko, Trawden and Worsthorne. In 2011 the area was recorded at having a population of 149,422. It is the third most populous urban area in Lancashire after Preston and Blackpool, with slightly more people than the urban areas of Cambridge or York.

These settlements along the Leeds and Liverpool Canal expanded in the nineteenth century. The area's economy was dominated by cotton manufacturing and in the four decades after World War I the number of cotton workers reduced by over 50%. The population of approximately 187,000 in 1931, declining to 156,000 in 1961.

The were six sub-divisions, with 73,021 in Burnley, 28,998 in Nelson, 20,118 in Colne, 11,091 in Padiham, 10,047 in Brierfield and 5,261 in Barrowford.

This definition includes, at the western extremity, the predominantly industrial parts of Altham in the Borough of Hyndburn and Simonstone in the Ribble Valley. The gender makeup of the population was 73,364 male and 76,058 female. 65.1% of residents aged 16 to 74 were classed as economically active, with 2.1% long-term unemployed. The largest employment sectors were manufacturing 19.1%, wholesale and retail trade including motor vehicle repairs 17.5%, and health and social work 14.6%. The ethnic makeup of the whole urban area was 81% white and 17% Asian. Other ethnic minorities were around 2%.

The Centre for Cities define a theoretical city of Burnley based on a primary urban area equivalent to the total area of the boroughs of Burnley and Pendle. At 21.34%, more people are employed in the manufacturing industry than any other PUA in the UK, and it also ranks highly for the value of goods exports per job. The figure of 17.6% of the working age population with no formal qualifications is also the highest and the average weekly earnings of £402.49 is the lowest. As a result, despite having the lowest mean house price of £113,036.96, it also has the lowest housing affordability ratio.

See also
List of urban areas in the United Kingdom

References

Burnley
Borough of Pendle
Lancashire
Urban areas of England